The Kvinna till Kvinna Foundation (English: Woman to Woman) is a Swedish organization founded in 1993 as a result of the Yugoslav Wars. It supports women in war and conflict zones with a strong concentration on the Balkans, but is also active in the Middle East and the Caucasus. It works closely together with the people who live in these areas, because Kvinna till Kvinna believes that democracy can only be built by their inhabitants. The organizations' role is simply to support these women, who are often also gathered in organizations, to build up democracy on the basis of their own needs. 

In 2002, Kvinna till Kvinna received the Right Livelihood Award "for its successes in addressing ethnic hatred by helping war-torn women to be the major agents of peace-building and reconciliation."

References

External links 
Kvinna till Kvinna website
Right Livelihood Award website

Organizations established in 1993
Human rights organizations based in Sweden